In kayaking, a playspot is a place where there are favorable stationary features on rivers, in particular standing waves (which may be breaking or partially breaking), 'holes' and 'stoppers', where water flows back on itself creating a retentive feature (these are often formed at the bottom of small drops or weirs), or eddy lines (the boundary between slow moving water at the rivers' edge, and faster water).

Playspots exist both in natural and artificial whitewater.

Playboating
Playboating is sometimes performed on dynamic moving features such as haystacks (large boils) and whirlpools, or on flat water (this is often referred to as flatwheeling). Playspots are found on natural whitewater, on artificial weirs, on artificial whitewater courses, and occasionally on tidal races in the sea.

Popular Playspots

Natural year-round playspots
Europe
 The Rabioux wave on the Durance in France
 Hawaii-sur-Rhône on the Rhône River, in Lyon, France

North America
 Lunch Counter on the Snake River in Wyoming
 Hell Hole on the Ocoee River in Tennessee
 Rock Island State Park in the Cumberland Mountains of Tennessee
 School House Rock "KRH" playhole in California
 Zoar Gap rapid on the Deerfield River near Charlemont, Massachusetts
 Kananaskis River in Alberta, Canada

Further natural year-round playspots
 Kaituna "bottom Hole" Rotorua, New Zealand

High volume rivers
Many high-volume rivers are often run for their playspots:

Africa
 The White Nile in Uganda
 The Zambezi in Zambia

North America
 The Slave River in Canada
 Mini Bus, Big Bus, Gladiator, and Garburator on The Ottawa River in Canada
 The Lachine Rapids in Quebec
 Wave-o-Saurus on the Connecticut River in Holyoke, Massachusetts

Weirs
 Hurley Weir on the Thames, near London
 Sluice on River Liffey, Lucan, Ireland
 Shrewsbury, Shropshire Weir on the River Severn

Man-enhanced playspots

Europe
 Terminator Wave, Erzherzog-Johann-Brücke, Graz, Austria
 Almwelle, Almkanal, Salzburg, Austria
 Eisbach, Munich, Germany

North America
 The Gutter on the Payette River in Horseshoe Bend, Idaho
 The U.S. National Whitewater Center in Charlotte, North Carolina
 The Salida playhole in Colorado
 The Golden Kayak Park in Golden, Colorado
 The Lower Saluda River in Columbia, SC. Specifically, Millrace Rapids near the Riverbanks Zoo
 Rio Vista Park on the San Marcos River in San Marcos, Texas
 Slumber Falls on the Guadalupe River near New Braunfels, Texas
 'Heavy D', or 'The Ruins' in the deschenes on the Ottawa River in Ottawa, Ontario

Tidal races
Europe
 The Bitches in Wales
 The Swellies on the Menai Strait, Wales
 The Falls of Lora in Scotland
 The Arches, Malahide Estuary in Dublin, Ireland
 Clifden Hole, Clifden, County Galway, Ireland

North America
 Skookumchuck Narrows in Canada
 Cohasset Tidal Rip in Cohasset, Massachusetts
 Sheepscot Reversing Falls in Newcastle, Maine

Others
The Tryweryn in Wales, the Dee near Llangollen in Wales, the Washburn in England, and Hambledon Weir on the Thames have been modified (by moving boulders on the river bed, or in the case of Hambledon by installing pneumatic kicker ramps on the river bed) to create better playspots.

Construction has been completed on Brennan's Wave a project in Missoula, USA, that is converting a broken diversion dam into a playpark for kayakers.

References

Kayaking